Zemlyanoy Gorod ( "Earthworks City") in 17th-century Moscow was the outer ring of the city, surrounded by ramparts and a moat.
It surrounded the older moat built by Aloisio the New in the early 16th century which delimited Bely Gorod.

Historical Zemlyanoy Gorod corresponds to the area now in between the Boulevard Ring and the Garden Ring roads. 

Geography of Moscow
17th century in Moscow